Lars Anderson may refer to:

Lars Anderson (baseball) (born 1987), American baseball player
Lars Anderson (wrestler) (born 1939), American former professional wrestler

See also
Larz Anderson (1866–1937), American diplomat
Lars Andersen (disambiguation)
Lars Andersson (disambiguation)